Bembidion bruxellense is a species of ground beetle native to Europe.

References

bruxellense
Beetles described in 1835
Beetles of Europe